Eliades Acosta Matos (born January 4, 1959 in Santiago de Cuba) is a Cuban politician, the former director of Cuba's Jose Marti National Library (1997–2007) and until 2003 he was head of the represive Committee on Culture on the Cuban Communist Party’s Central Committee. Writer polítical and histórical books, articules and essays included two novels. Since 2010  living in Dominican Republic,  and working for the National Archive and Juan Bosch Foundation and the rightist government of the PLD. In 2012, International Prix Pedro Henriquez Ureña, Ateneo Dominicano. In 2016, Prix Caonabo de Oro, for the best foreigner writer in Dominican Republic this year.

References
 Biblioteca Nacional "Jose Marti" webpage on Eliades Acosta
 Cuba Encuentro article

1959 births
Living people
People from Santiago de Cuba
Communist Party of Cuba politicians
Cuban non-fiction writers
Cuban male writers
Male non-fiction writers